In mathematics and mathematical physics, a coordinate basis or holonomic basis for a differentiable manifold  is a set of basis vector fields  defined at every point  of a region of the manifold as

where  is the displacement vector between the point  and a nearby point

It is possible to make an association between such a basis and directional derivative operators.

Since we have that , the identification is often made between a coordinate basis vector  and the partial derivative operator , under the interpretation of vectors as operators acting on functions.

A local condition for a basis  to be holonomic is that all mutual Lie derivatives vanish:

A basis that is not holonomic is called an anholonomic, non-holonomic or non-coordinate basis.

An obvious exception is when  is the real coordinate space  considered as a manifold with  being the Euclidean metric  at every point.

References

See also
Jet bundle
Tetrad formalism
Ricci calculus

Differential geometry
Mathematical physics